Astragalus anxius is a rare species of milkvetch known by the common names troubled milkvetch and Ash Valley milkvetch. It is endemic to northern Lassen County, California, where it grows in the volcanic soil of the Modoc Plateau. It was formally described in 1992. There are only 6 known occurrences, some of which are threatened by livestock trampling.

Description
Astragalus anxius is a perennial herb forming a matted patch of slender, delicate stems no longer than 20 centimeters. It is coated thinly in wavy hairs. The leaves are a few centimeters long and made up of several leaflets. The inflorescence contains 7 to 15 pealike flowers. Each flower is bicolored, the lower petals usually white and the upper banner petals purple to purple-veined white. The fruit is a hairy, oval-shaped legume pod up to half a centimeter long which dries to a papery texture.

References

External links
Jepson Manual Treatment - Astragalus anxius
USDA Plants Profile; Astragalus anxius 
Astragalus anxius - Photo gallery

anxius
Endemic flora of California
Flora of the Great Basin
~
~
Natural history of Lassen County, California
Plants described in 1992
Critically endangered flora of California